The 2009–10 Duke Blue Devils women's basketball team represented Duke University in the 2009–10 NCAA Division I basketball season. The Blue Devils were coached by Joanne P. McCallie, (also known as Coach P) and the Blue Devils played their home games at Cameron Indoor Stadium in Durham, North Carolina. The Blue Devils are a member of the Atlantic Coast Conference.

Offseason
April 23, 2009: Duke University senior Carrem Gay has signed a training camp contract with the Connecticut Sun of the WNBA.  Gay along with Kristi Cirone of Illinois State and Ashley Hayes of Murray State will get a chance to compete for a place on the club’s roster.
May 5, 2009:
The Atlantic Coast Conference and the Big Ten Conference announced the pairings for the annual Big Ten/ACC Challenge for women’s basketball, which is in its third year of a four-year agreement.  The 2009 Challenge will involve Ohio State playing Duke on December 3.

Preseason

Regular season
The Blue Devils were victorious in the Caribbean Challenge. The Challenge was held in Cancun and was held from November 26–27.

Roster

Schedule

Player stats

Postseason

NCAA basketball tournament

Awards and honors

Team players drafted into the WNBA

See also
2009–10 ACC women’s basketball season
2009–10 NCAA Division I women's basketball season
List of Atlantic Coast Conference women's basketball regular season champions
List of Atlantic Coast Conference women's basketball tournament champions

References

External links
Official Site

Duke Blue Devils women's basketball seasons
Duke